Scolecophilidae is a family of nematodes belonging to the order Spirurida.

Genera:
 Scolecophiloides
 Scolecophilus Baylis & Daubney, 1922

References

Spirurida